The castle of Quel is a fortress built in the year 1470. It is located in Quel,  La Rioja (Spain).

Location 
Located on a hill with gentle slopes on the north face and steep slopes in the south. This hilltop allowed the troops posted in the castle having to defend just three sides, out of the four, in case of attack.

17 November 1971 the Tax Department of Logroño auctioned it for 19.350 pesetas, being acquired by a group of businessmen who wanted to develop touristic projects which were never carried out.

Structure 
The castle of Quel has two parts:
 the main Tower
 the walls.

References

External links 

 Castle of Quel. Official website of the Town Hall of Quel.

Castles in La Rioja